Telish Rock (‘Skala Telish’ ska-'la te-'lish) is the islet off the south coast of Livingston Island in the South Shetland Islands, Antarctica situated  south of Elephant Point and  northwest by west of Enchantress Rocks.  Extending .  The area was visited by early 19th century sealers.

The islet is named after the settlement of Telish in northern Bulgaria.

Location
British mapping in 1968, Chilean in 1971, Argentine in 1980, Spanish in 1993 and Bulgarian in 2005, 2009 and 2010.

See also 
 Composite Antarctic Gazetteer
 List of Antarctic islands south of 60° S
 SCAR
 Territorial claims in Antarctica

Maps
 L.L. Ivanov. Antarctica: Livingston Island and Greenwich, Robert, Snow and Smith Islands. Scale 1:120000 topographic map. Troyan: Manfred Wörner Foundation, 2010.  (First edition 2009. )
 Antarctic Digital Database (ADD). Scale 1:250000 topographic map of Antarctica. Scientific Committee on Antarctic Research (SCAR). Since 1993, regularly upgraded and updated.
 L.L. Ivanov. Antarctica: Livingston Island and Smith Island. Scale 1:100000 topographic map. Manfred Wörner Foundation, 2017.

References
 Telish Rock. SCAR Composite Antarctic Gazetteer
 Bulgarian Antarctic Gazetteer. Antarctic Place-names Commission. (details in Bulgarian, basic data in English)

External links
 Telish Rock. Copernix satellite image

Islands of Livingston Island
Bulgaria and the Antarctic